St. Anthony's High School was an aided co-educational school that provided primary and secondary education. It is located within Assolna village, neighbouring Regina Martyrum High School in the Indian coastal state of Goa. The school opened in the year 1921, later being established on 28 August 1964 and has been closed since the 2000s.

History
The school had opened since 1921, later on 28 August 1964, it was established under a deed of trust and the management was taken over by the St. Anthony's High School Trust.

Key people

Headmistresses/Headmasters

Faculty
The school had five teaching faculty members and three non teaching staff, which amounted to eight persons faculty. The student teacher ratio of the school was six.

Amenities
The school had 7 blackboards that were used in classrooms. It also had a library which contained 429 books and a computer lab that included 12 computers for the students.

Achievements
The school had an annual pass percentage of 100%. The last recorded 9.09% students scored first class in their final term exams.

Notable alumni
 P. G. Kakodkar, Indian career banker
 Roque Santana Fernandes, Indian politician and freedom fighter

See also

 List of schools in Goa
 Education in Goa

Notes

References

 

Schools in Goa
Schools in India
Private schools in Goa
Education in South Goa district
Defunct schools in India
Defunct high schools
High schools and secondary schools in Goa
1920s establishments in Portuguese India
1964 establishments in Goa, Daman and Diu
Buildings and structures in Goa
Catholic schools in India